Geri is a village in the Gori Municipality of Shida Kartli in central Georgia, and in the Tskhinvali District of South Ossetia.

Notes

References
 Georgian Soviet Encyclopedia Vol. 3, p. 98, 1978.

Populated places in Shida Kartli
Populated places in South Ossetia